Great Britain participated at the 2015 European Games, in Baku, Azerbaijan from 12 to 28 June 2015. As this was the inaugural Games, this was Great Britain's first appearance.

Before the Games 
On 17 October 2014, the British Olympic Association announced that 14 sports and 20 disciplines were seeking qualification for the games.

On 23 April 2015, the British Olympic Association announced the selection of a team of 153 athletes to compete at the Games with a further 10 male boxers to be chosen shortly. Although Great Britain had won several quota places in both badminton and cycling they have chosen not to participate in these sports in Baku. On 6 May 2015, the British Olympic Association named an additional ten athletes – 9 boxing, 1 shooting – to complete the British team to compete in Baku.

On 2 June 2015, it was announced that five athletes had withdrawn from the British team: Lisa Whiteside (boxing), Tyesha Mattis and Rebecca Tunney (both artistic gymnastics), and Helen Jenkins and Jess Learmonth (both triathlon). Mattis and Tunney were replaced by Charlie Fellows and Georgina Hockenhull.

Games Summary
Great Britain left the inaugural Games with a total of 47 medals (18 gold, 10 silver, and 19 bronze), finishing third in the medal table rankings, and fourth in the total number of medal rankings. At least one medal was awarded to Team GB in nine sports, seven of them contained at least one gold.  Great Britain topped the medal table in triathlon, and diving, although the most successful sport for Great Britain was swimming, with 23 medals, seven gold.

Seventeen British athletes won more than a single European Games medal in Baku, with the most successful being swimmers Duncan Scott, with three golds and three silvers, both the most successful (three golds) and most decorated (six medals) athlete and Luke Greenback with two golds and two silvers, as well as a world junior record in 200 metres backstroke, the only other multiple gold medalist. Abbie Wood, with one gold, one silver and two bronze medals was the most successful female competitor for Great Britain, and one of three athletes, with diver James Heatly and fellow swimmer Martyn Walton, to win at least one medal of every colour. Georgia Coates, with five medals, was the most decorated female competitor for Great Britain at the Games.

The first medal, and gold medal, won at the Games, and by extension the first ever European Games medal and gold medal ever won by Great Britain was achieved by Gordon Benson in men's triathlon; in doing so, he guaranteed a place in the men's triathlon for Great Britain, though not necessarily for himself, at the 2016 Summer Olympics. His win also continued Great Britain's dominance of the event, holding titles at European, European Games, Commonwealth Games, Youth Olympic and Olympic Games levels.

In the fencing hall, Richard Kruse, Marcus Mepstead, Ben Peggs and won the gold in team foil, defeating Olympic champions Italy, and winning Great Britain's first team fencing medal at European or Global level in fifty years, and the first gold ever at that level.

Seventeen-year-old Amber Hill overcame a marathon shoot off in the final to claim Britain's only shooting Gold in women's skeet, while the pool proved a happy hunting ground, with eleven golds across swimming and diving.

In the boxing hall, Nicola Adams continued her domination of her weight category, to add European Games gold to her Commonwealth and Olympic Games titles. Joe Joyce maintained Great Britain's grip on the super-heavyweight division, taking gold to echo the achievements of Anthony Joshua in the 2012 Summer Olympics. On the taekwondo mat, Jade Jones added the European Games gold to her Olympic title, only months after a controversial loss at the World Championships. Newcomer, and converted kickboxer Charlie Maddock also won gold, but Bianca Walkden was unable to repeat her World title success. Meanwhile, the publicised rivalry between former Great Britain athlete Aaron Cook, now fighting for Moldova, and Olympic bronze medalist Lutalo Mohommad failed to materialise as both lost early in their competition. However, as in 2012, Mohommad recovered to take bronze through the repechage.

After the Games 
At the closing ceremony, the flag of Great Britain was born by Joe Joyce. Although the Games received limited coverage in Great Britain, shown domestically only on BT Sport, a subscription channel, the success of the team, particularly of Olympic champions Adams and Jones helped drive interest. By the conclusion of the Games it was reported that Manchester was considering bidding for the 2023 edition of the Games; following the award of the 2018 European Championships to Glasgow, Scotland and the 2022 Commonwealth Games to Birmingham, England, no further interest in hosting the Games was registered.

Medal summary
The following British competitors won medals at the Games.

|  style="text-align:left; width:80%; vertical-align:top;"|

Multiple medalists
The following Team GB competitors won multiple medals at the 2015 European Games.

|  style="text-align:left; width:80%; vertical-align:top;"|

|  style="text-align:left; width:20%; vertical-align:top;"|

Archery

Great Britain qualified for three quota places in the women's archery events at the Games, and as a result also qualified for the women's team event. Great Britain qualified for one quota place in the men's event, and as a result also qualified Great Britain for the mixed gender team event.

Great Britain endured mixed fortunes at the archery field, failing to qualify from the ranking round for the mixed pairs events, and failing to reach the quarter-finals in any of the disciplines; Kieran Slater's run to the last sixteen in the men's individual, where he lost narrowly to the French archer Plihon, was the strongest British performance.

Azerbaijan as host gained automatic entry into the last sixteen despite a lower qualification score.

Boxing

Great Britain qualified four quota places in the women's boxing events, and ten in the men's events, at the Games.  The female members of the British boxing squad were confirmed on 23 April 2015. On 6 May 2015, the names of nine boxers were added to the British squad.

Great Britain had a relatively successful Games in the boxing ring, with four medals from 14 classes, highlighted by the victories of Olympic and Commonwealth Games champion, and Great Britain flagbearer, Nicola Adams, and Commonwealth Games super-heavyweight champion Joe Joyce, and a first senior medal for Sandy Ryan. Top seed Anthony Fowler lost in his first round bout, as did former world champion and Olympian Savannah Marshall. Great Britain finished fourth in the boxing medal table, narrowly behind Ireland, but well behind superpowers Russia and hosts Azerbaijan.

Men

Shooting

Great Britain secured the maximum number of quotas in the shotgun events based on the European rankings on 31 December 2014. Quotas were also won in some of the rifle events.

Amber Hill, a 17-year-old skeet shooter won Great Britain's only shooting medal, the gold medal in women's skeet, following a marathon shoot-off. Steve Scott set the Games record in men's double trap qualification, but slipped to fifth in the semi-finals, missing out on a medal match.

Men

Women

SO – shoot-off
GR – Games record
QB – qualified for bronze medal match
QG – qualified for gold and silver medals match

Swimming

Following the European Junior Swimming Championships held in July 2014, LEN informed each NOC how many swimming quotas they would receive for the European Games. In December 2014, British Swimming published their selection criteria for the Games and confirmed that they would be sending a full team of 24 swimmers.

Ranks are given as overall placements.

 Men

 Women

 Mixed

Synchronised Swimming

Great Britain secured a place in all the synchronised swimming events in Baku by finishing fifth at a qualifier held in Turkey in February, 2015.

 Team – Phoebe Bradley-Smith, Jorja Brown, Danielle Cooper, Jodie Cowie, Emma Critchley, Lara Hockin, Esme Lower, Genevieve Randall, Hannah Randall, Rebecca Richardson

Table Tennis

Based on the ITTF European rankings as at 1 March 2015, Great Britain  secured three quotas for the Games.

Taekwondo

Based on the WTF rankings as at 31 March 2015, Great Britain secured seven quotas for the Games. Ruebyn Richards was originally selected for the men's 68 kg class, but was replaced by Martin Stamper.

GP = Golden Point

Triathlon

Great Britain qualified for one quota place in both the men's and women's events by results in the European Triathlon Championships. Further quota places were won through end of year rankings. As a result, Great Britain had a full quota of places at Baku 2015.

Gordon Benson won Great Britain's first European Games medal, and first gold, in the men's race. In doing so, he guaranteed a quota place in men's triathlon for the 2016 Summer Olympics.

Volleyball

Based on the rankings on 1 January 2015, Great Britain secured a single quota place in men's beach volleyball.

Beach

Water Polo

Great Britain's U17 Women's Water Polo team secured qualification for the games at a qualifier held in Nice, France, in March, 2015.

 Women's team – Dani Brazier, Isabelle Dean, Hannah Edwards, Sophie Jackson, Fleur Kennedy, Verity McCoy, Mhairi Nurthen, Lara Partridge, Hayley Price, Kathy Rogers, Grace Rowland, Lucy Shaw, Beth Ward

Preliminary Matches

7th–12th Classification

Quarter-final

11th–12th

Wrestling

Following the European Wrestling Championships held in April 2014, UWW informed the British Wrestling Association that they would receive 2 quota places.

References

Nations at the 2015 European Games
European Games
2015